Magyar vándor (English: The Hungarian Strayer) is a 2004 Hungarian action comedy film directed by Gábor Herendi and starring Károly Gesztesi, János Gyuriska and Gyula Bodrogi.

The main story
The seven leaders of the Hungarians wake up after a very hard party in Etelköz. Then they realise that their beloved Hungarians are gone without them to conquest... In this exciting movie the leaders have to find the new home, and their people as well. During their migration they live through the history of Hungary, both the comic and tragicomic episodes, but instead of forests and castles, they occupy inns and hotels, and they are fighting with harem girls instead of Mongols or Tatars. And the big battle is not with weapons and guns, but on a soccer field, with a football and two teams...

Main cast
 Károly Gesztesi ... Álmos
 János Gyuriska ... Előd
 János Greifenstein ... Ond
 Zoltán Seress ... Kond
 Győző Szabó ... Tas
 Tibor Szervét ... Huba
 István Hajdú ... Töhötöm
 Gyula Bodrogi ... General Wienerschnitzz
 János Gálvölgyi ... Turkish Pasha
 László Fekete ... Toldi Miklós
 András Hajós ... Singer

External links

2004 films
2000s action comedy films
2000s Hungarian-language films
Hungarian comedy films
2004 comedy films